Christian Chevallier (Angers, 12 July 1930 - 14 September 2008) was a French songwriter, arranger, and jazz orchestra leader.

References

1930 births
2008 deaths
French songwriters
Male songwriters
20th-century French musicians